In automata theory, a permutation automaton, or pure-group automaton, is a  deterministic finite automaton such that each input symbol permutes the set of states.

Formally, a deterministic finite automaton  may be defined by the tuple (Q, Σ, δ, q0, F),

A formal language is p-regular (also: a pure-group language) if it is accepted by a permutation automaton. For example, the set of strings of even length forms a p-regular language: it may be accepted by a permutation automaton with two states in which every transition replaces one state by the other.

Applications 
The pure-group languages were the first interesting family of regular languages for which the star height problem was proved to be computable.

Another mathematical problem on regular languages is the separating words problem, which asks for the size of a smallest deterministic finite automaton that distinguishes between two given words of length at most n – by accepting one word and rejecting the other. The problem was later studied for the restriction to permutation automata.

References 

Permutations
Finite automata